Hermon is a village 22 km north of Wellington and 8 km from Porseleinberg. Of Hebrew origin, the name means 'elevated, 'exalted', the reference being to the biblical Mount Hermon (Deut. 3:8, 9)..

References

Populated places in the Drakenstein Local Municipality